Protacio Guevara Gungon (June 19, 1925 – April 26, 2014) was a Catholic bishop.

Ordained to the priesthood in 1952, Gungon was named auxiliary bishop of the Archdiocese of Manila, Philippines and titular bishop of Obba in 1977. In 1983, he became the first Bishop of Antipolo, and served until 2001. He died on April 26, 2014 at the age of 88—two months before his 89th birthday.

Notes

1925 births
2014 deaths
20th-century Roman Catholic bishops in the Philippines